Bouvigny-Boyeffles is a commune in the Pas-de-Calais department in the Hauts-de-France region in northern France.

Geography

Population

Sights
 The church of St. Marin, dating from the fifteenth century.
 The modern church of St. Martin.
 The eighteenth-century chateau of Boyeffles.
 The radio and TV transmitter.

See also
Communes of the Pas-de-Calais department

References

External links

 Website of the Communaupole de Lens-Liévin 

Communes of Pas-de-Calais
Artois